Anna Andreeva (August 17, 1917 – February 27, 2008) was a Russian textile designer.

Career 

Andreeva's textile designs for mass production, "Cubes", "Olympics”, “Urban Grid”, “Soviet Sport”, and “Soviet Cosmos,” were among the most popular prints distributed within Socialist Republics in the 1960s and 1970s and were often published in the magazine .

She is also the author of the iconic Soviet optical geometric and floral prints that were presented at the International Textile Exhibitions and even traded by the Soviet government to French and Italian textile industries. Beyond her extensive work for mass production, Andreeva was often called to prepare exclusive designs for governmental purposes. Silk shawls after her drawings were presented Soviet official delegations to the political leaders of other countries as part of cultural diplomacy. Her work “Cosmos”, dedicated to the first man in space Yuri Gagarin, was an official present to the Queen Elizabeth II during Nikita Khrushchev’s first visit to the United Kingdom in 1961. Her design for the World Congress of Women became a symbol of the Fifth World Congress of Women, Moscow, July 24–29, 1963. During the 60s Andreeva created several designs for the International Movie Festival in Moscow. As a decorative artist working on state commissions for festivals and international exhibitions, she was granted more freedom to experiment with techniques and motifs than her fine arts peers.

Her series "Electrification," which included large geometric tapestries, served as the central objects at the All Union Exhibition of the Fortieth Anniversary of the October Revolution at the Saint Petersburg Manege. Her work is also known as the Soviet analogue of Optical Art. Andreeva's designs represented the Soviet textile industry at Expo 1967 in Montreal. Along with Soviet costume designer Alla Levasheva, Andreeva constructed a special exhibition platform of Soviet textile ideas at Expo 1970 in Tokyo.

Andreeva held several key positions in the Artists' Union of the USSR, which she joined in 1946. From 1960 to 1970 she was the head of its Textile and Decorative Arts section. She was also in charge of establishing networks for the textile industry and silk production within the Socialist Bloc. She supervised artistic committees at silk factories in Central Asia, Georgia, Armenia, and the Urals, as well as sanatoriums for the Union.

Early life and education 

Andreeva was born in 1917 into a wealthy family of Russian merchants. When the family's home was seized by the Red Army, 9 year-old Andreeva fled to Moscow to live with distant relatives. Prior to entering the Moscow Textile Institute, Andreeva attended the Rabfak School of Workers. She entered the lab of Vladimir Favorsky and Igor Grabar.

Awards and honors
 Repin's All-Union Prise for the textile design: “Borodino” 1961
 Lenin's All Union Award for the textile design “Moscow streets” 1959
 Andreeva's designs for textile are in the Collections: State Tretyakov Gallery Moscow, Tzarizyno State Gallery Moscow

Personal
Her spouse was Boris Andreev (1916-1996), a Soviet scientist and engineer.

References

Further reading
 "Еxhibition "The Thaw: 1953–1968" opens at the Museum of Moscow", Mos.ru, December 16, 2016
 O. Kabanova, "The Museum of Moscow opens festival "The Thaw", Vedomosti.ru, December 19, 2016
 A. Tolstova "The Moscow Thaw: 1953-1968 in the Museum of Moscow". Kommersant.ru, February 16, 2017
 P. Erizanu  "How Soviet artist Anna Andreeva found freedom for state censors in fabric". calvertjournal.com, September 23, 2020
 "Secret history. The soviet textile artist who wove together technology and the avant-garde", elephant.art, Aug 14,2020
 H. Mcgivern, S. Kishkovsky, V. Stapley-Brown "Top five acquisitions in June", theartnewspaper.com,June 6, 2019
 Sulkin O. "Russian textile design is bought by MoMA, New York", golosameriki.com, Dec 20, 2019
 mos.ru and Mosgortur Agency "Moscow textiles celebrate 150th anniversary. Curator's guide to Moscow Fabrics exhibition", mos.ru, Oct 06, 2019

External links
 Yevgeny Alexeyev /State Tretyakov Gallery "The Thaw: Anatomy of a Cultural Awakening", The Moscow Times, March 03, 2017 
 "History of fashion: from avant-garde to GOST", Architizer.com, 2015
 
 

1917 births
2008 deaths
Russian women artists
People from Tambov
Textile designers